Channomuraena bauchotae is a moray eel found in the western Indian Ocean. It inhabits rocky coasts.

References

Muraenidae
Fish described in 1994